Gaffney, Bennett and Associates is a law firm that specializes in lobbying headquartered in New Britain, Connecticut. They are the largest lobbying firm in the state of Connecticut.

History 
Gaffney, Bennett and Associates was founded in the mid 1980s by Jay Malcynsky and Brian Gaffney in New Britain, Connecticut. The firm has been heavily involved with representing big companies seeking state aid or tax breaks to expand their presence in Connecticut.

In the late 1990s the firm represented the New England Patriots in negotiations with the State of Connecticut to move the Patriots to Hartford.

In 2009 Gaffney, Bennett and Associates made twice as much as the second largest lobbying firm. In 2011 they made over $4.7 million from lobbying services, again more than twice as much as the second largest lobbying firm.

In 2012 Vernon Mayor George F. Apel ended the town contract with Gaffney, Bennett and Associates which the town had on retainer since 2009.

In 2015 Gaffney, Bennett and Associates revenue was three times that of the second largest lobbying company in the state.

Gaffney Bennett Public Relations 
In 2002 Gaffney, Bennett and Associates launched a PR Services arm called Gaffney Bennett Public Relations (GBPR) to handle corporate positioning, media relations, crisis communications, brand management, and cause-related marketing for existing and new clients. GBPR has offices in Connecticut and New York City. In 2011 GBPR launched a line of a la carte PR services called "the Press Release Shop." In 2019 GBPR hired North Carolina based Ted Novin to split his time between their New York office and clients in North Carolina. Novin had previously been a spokesperson for the National Rifle Association and the National Shooting Sports Foundation.

Major clients 
 City of Bridgeport
 City of Stamford
 Connecticut Taxi Drivers Association
 Tomasso Brothers, Inc.
Walmart
Connecticut Association for the Performing Arts
Eversource

External links 
 Website 
 Gaffney Bennett Public Relations 
 2013 client disclosure

References 

Companies based in Hartford County, Connecticut
Privately held companies based in Connecticut
Lobbying firms in the United States
Law firms established in 1984